The 2002 season was the St. Louis Rams' 65th in the National Football League, their eighth in St. Louis and their third under head coach Mike Martz.

Fresh off their trip from Super Bowl XXXVI which ended with a loss to the 11–5 Patriots, the Rams collapsed and missed the playoffs for the first time since 1998, losing their first five games.

The season saw the emergence of new quarterback Marc Bulger, who filled in for an injured Kurt Warner and Jamie Martin. The Rams won six straight games where Bulger started and finished, but his season ended in Week 16 at Seattle.

However, the Rams did end the season on a high note with a 31–20 victory at home against the 49ers in Week 17 and they finished the season with a 7–9 record.

History 
The years leading up to the 2002 season had the making of a roller coaster dynasty. It all began in the offseason before the 1999 season. They were able to trade for Marshall Faulk who was arguably the best running back of the time. They signed a franchise quarterback, Trent Green, who knew how to lead a team. They drafted a young wide receiver prospect, Torry Holt, and just like that their offense is completely new. Fast forward to the preseason when Green experienced a season-ending injury and all the fans thought the season was over. In comes 27 year-old Kurt Warner, who nobody knew about and who has barely played in the NFL.

This season marked the decline of Kurt Warner and the end of "The Greatest Show On Turf". This also marked the first season where the Rams did not make the playoffs under Mike Martz.

Star running back Marshall Faulk started in just 10 games due to ankle injury he suffered against San Diego. This weakened the Rams' running game and he finished the season with just 953 yards rushing, his lowest since 1996, where he rushed for 587 yards. At that time, he was a member of the Indianapolis Colts. His 953 rushing yards this season ended his streak of five straight 1,000 yard rushing seasons. Despite a down year, Faulk was still voted to play in the Pro Bowl after the season for the seventh and final time in his Hall of Fame career.

For the season, the team changed their uniforms, removing the side panels on the jersey.

Offseason

2002 Expansion Draft

Draft

Roster

Regular season

Schedule

Game Summaries

Week 11: vs. Chicago Bears

Standings 

 St. Louis finished ahead of Seattle in the NFC West based on better division record (4–2 to 2–4).

References 

St. Louis Rams
St. Louis Rams seasons
St Louis